The following active airports serve the Lower Mainland region of British Columbia, Canada, which is to say Greater Vancouver and the Fraser Valley:

Land airports

Scheduled commercial airline service

Other

Former

Water aerodromes

Scheduled commercial airline service

Other

Former

Heliports

Scheduled commercial airline service

Other

See also

 List of airports in the Gulf Islands
 List of airports in the Okanagan
 List of airports in the Prince Rupert area
 List of airports on Vancouver Island
 List of airports in Greater Victoria

References

 
Transport in Greater Vancouver
Vancouver
Lists of buildings and structures in British Columbia
Airports
Vancouver